The 9.15 cm leichtes Minenwerfer System Lanz (Trench mortar) was a light mortar used by Germany and Austria-Hungary in World War I. 
It was a smooth-bore, breech-loading design that used smokeless propellant. It was chosen by the Austrians as an interim replacement for their 9 cm Minenwerfer M 14, pending development of a superior domestic design, which eventually turned out to be the 9 cm Minenwerfer M 17. The older Austrian design had a prominent firing signature, a less effective bomb and shorter range than the Lanz. Over 500 were ordered with deliveries beginning in April 1917.

References

 Ortner, M. Christian. The Austro-Hungarian Artillery From 1867 to 1918: Technology, Organization, and Tactics. Vienna, Verlag Militaria, 2007

External links

Minenwerfer Lanz on Landships

World War I infantry mortars of Germany
Mortars of Austria-Hungary
90 mm artillery